"Glitterball" is a song by British drum and bass duo Sigma. It features vocals from British singer and songwriter Ella Henderson. The song was released as a digital download in the United Kingdom on 24 July 2015 and is the fifth single from their debut studio album Life (2015). The single peaked at number four on the UK Singles Chart. It was at number 78 on the year-end chart in the UK for 2015.

Music video
The music video for Glitterball was filmed on location in Ibiza. It features Henderson and both members of Sigma.

Track listing
Digital download
"Glitterball"  – 3:46

Digital download – remixes
"Glitterball"  – 3:59
"Glitterball"  – 3:44
"Glitterball"  – 2:56
"Glitterball"  – 4:42
"Glitterball"  – 3:18
"Glitterball"  – 3:36
"Glitterball"  – 3:44
"Glitterball"  – 4:39

Critical reception
4Music described it as a "euphoric ... hands-in-the-air anthem".

Charts and certifications

Weekly charts

Year-end charts

Certifications

Release history

References

2015 songs
2015 singles
Sigma songs
Ella Henderson songs
Songs written by Wayne Hector
Songs written by Jim Eliot
Songs written by Mima Stilwell
All Around the World Productions singles
Number-one singles in Scotland